Emlyn James John (4 March 1907 – 1962) was a Welsh professional footballer who played as a defender. He began his career with Mid Rhondda before playing in the Football League with Cardiff City and Newport County. He later played for Barry Town.

References

1907 births
1962 deaths
Welsh footballers
Mid Rhondda F.C. players
Cardiff City F.C. players
Newport County A.F.C. players
Barry Town United F.C. players
English Football League players
Association football defenders